Alma Cero (born Alma Cero Delgado Quintero on August 8, 1975, in Mexico City, Mexico) is a Mexican actress, singer, television hostess and ballerina. She better known from series María de Todos los Ángeles.

Biography
Cero was born on August 8, 1975, in Mexico City, Mexico. Studied music, dance and stage workshop at the INBA. Later entered to study acting in the CEA of Televisa. She participated in the television series María de Todos los Ángeles, playing the character of Rosa Aurora. In 2014, participated in the coverage of the Mundial 2014. Until September 2016, she conducted the television program Sabadazo.

Personal life 
In 1997 Cero she gave birth to her son Bruno. From 2014 she has a relationship with Edwin Luna.

Filmography

Hostess 
 Tumba Burros
 Sabadazo
 Estrella2
 Desmadruga2
 Par de Ases
 La jaula
 No manches
 Incognito
 TeleHit
 Cobertura Mundial 2014
 El Naucalpan Son Machín

Telenovelas 
 La tempestad (6 Episodes)

Series 
 María de Todos los Ángeles – Rosa Aurora Santa Cruz
 Como dice el dicho – Selene (1 Episode)
 Burócratas – Dolores "Lola" Hernández

Films 
 La derrota

References

External links 
 
Biografía de Alma Cero en Televisa.com

1975 births
Living people
Mexican telenovela actresses
Mexican television actresses
Mexican ballerinas
Mexican comedians
Mexican television presenters
Mexican television talk show hosts
Actresses from Mexico City
Singers from Mexico City
20th-century Mexican actresses
21st-century Mexican actresses
People from Mexico City
21st-century Mexican singers
21st-century Mexican women singers
Mexican women television presenters